Charles West "Red" Shurtliffe (April 12, 1907 – September 19, 1986) was an American football player. He was born in 1907 in New Martinsville, West Virginia, and attended Sisterville High School. He played college football for Marietta College and professional football in the National Football League (NFL) as a back for the Buffalo Bisons. He appeared in four NFL games during the 1929 season.

References

1907 births
1986 deaths
Buffalo Bisons (NFL) players
Players of American football from West Virginia